Marian Pabón (born c. 1958 in San Juan, Puerto Rico) is a Puerto Rican actress. She also had some success as a singer and recording artist.

Biography 
Pabón grew used to life in the spotlight: her father, Mario Pabón (San Pedro de Macorís, 1930–San Juan, 1996), was one of Puerto Rico’s most famous actors and directors. She was named after him; her family used the name "Marian" as a Female version of "Mario". Her paternal family were wealthy landowners from the Dominican Republic that left the country in the 1940s during the dictatorship of Rafael Trujillo.

Pabón was one of Puerto Rico's most prolific TV actresses when telenovelas were produced there. She was active in these Spanish language soap operas until 1989, when the last great Puerto Rican telenovela was produced.

Pabón also had a long theater career that has spanned over a decade, which started just as Puerto Rican telenovelas were phased out. A fan of musicals, she would also star in the occasional musical play as a singer and dancer (musicals are rarely produced in Puerto Rico, due to the market's relatively small size, which prevents expensive productions from lasting long enough to recoup production costs).

She also became a comedic actress during that period, notably as part of Sunshine Logroño's television productions. Notable among her characters at the time was "Paola", the helper of an incompetent magician who, whenever his magic tricks failed miserably, would always demand that she, who normally wore a form-hugging dress, prance around the stage as to save the act by turning it into a cheesecake display.

At the time, Pabón recorded a solo album. She had two minor hits that earned some airplay on Puerto Rican media: a cover version of Chubby Checker's "Let's Twist Again, and "Se Enteró Tu Mujer" ("Your Wife Now Knows"). The song tells the melodramatic story of the clandestine lover of a cheating husband who has learned that her lover's wife has discovered their affair; she is actually relieved by the discovery. Her deadpanned "...¡Y me alegro!" ("...and I'm happy for it!") is a soundbite on various Puerto Rican radio programs, and has become an audience favorite, perhaps as a local example of camp.

From 1999 until 2006, Pabón starred alongside Rene Monclova, among others, in Sunshine Logroño's television comedy, El Condominio. In this series she portrayed Brenda Q., a very assertive Niuyorican who has turned into a madam after a stint pursuing prostitution as a career. Brenda is weary of her male neighbors, who only perceive her sex appeal and are inevitably drawn to her breasts, and constantly (and angrily) demands that they only stare to her eyes. She has a cousin, Cari, (played by actress Cristina Soler), a nymphomaniac who has a relatively low intelligence quotient and bigger breasts than Brenda Q.'s, and whom she tries to coerce into doing sex acts for money with customers, which Cari would inevitably do rather willingly and not charge for, to Brenda's frustration.

Controversy arose in 2004 over whether that show should be cancelled because Tony Mojena had been the show's original producer, Pabón stuck by Logroño, defending the show as a workhouse for her fellow Puerto Rican co-stars.

Pabón is a full-time stage actress that has been involved in several of San Juan's most important plays of the 1990s and 2000s, and has performed the plays on tour around Puerto Rico.  With the possibility of El Condominio disappearing from Puerto Rican television, she also participates in a stage version of the hit TV show, which includes the same actors and characters of the television programs.

Pabón has participated in numerous Puerto Rican films such as Desvío al Paraiso (Wrong Way to Paradise) and Casi Casi.  This last film was written and directed by her nephews Tony Vallés and Jaime Vallés. She co-starred in this movie with another one of her nephews, Mario Pabón.

She is one of the most noted musical theatre performers in Puerto Rico having starred as Lola in the San Juan production of Damn Yankees (opposite Roberto Vigoreaux as Joe Hardy), Audrey in Little Shop of Horrors, Sister Mary Leo in the San Juan premiere of Sor-Presas (Nunsense), Roxie Hart in Chicago, and Liliane LaFleur in Nine.  She has also appeared in numerous zarzuelas (Spanish operettas).  She played Fraulein Kost in the 1995 San Juan production of Cabaret, taking over the lead role of Sally Bowles when the show's star, Ivette Rodriguez, took time off due to illness.  In 2006 she played Cassie in the Puerto Rican revival of A Chorus Line.

Filmography

Cinema 
 1994: Desvío al Paraiso: Police inspector
 1995: Manhattan Merengue!: Margaret
 2006: Casi Casi: Principal Richardson
 2010: Manuela y Manuel: Faraona
 2013: Broche de Oro: Madre Superiora
 2016: Pepo Pal Senado: Estela  
 2016: The Vessel: Rosita
 2017: Broche de Oro: Comienzos: Madre Superiora

Programmes 
 1980: El ídolo: Teresa
 1988: Cuqui: Una mujer como tú: Norma

Theater 
 Damn Yankees: Lola
 Little Shop of Horrors: Audrey
 Sor-Presas: Sister Mary Leo
 Chicago: Roxie Hart
 Nine: Liliane LaFleur
 Cabaret: Fraulein Kost
 2006: A Chorus Line: Cassie
 2008: Los hombres aman a las cabronas: Bárbara

See also 
List of Puerto Ricans

External links 
 
 dvdgo.com, Pabón films page

1950s births
Living people
People from San Juan, Puerto Rico
Puerto Rican people of Dominican Republic descent
20th-century Puerto Rican actresses
21st-century Puerto Rican actresses
Puerto Rican comedians
20th-century Puerto Rican women singers
Puerto Rican stage actresses
Puerto Rican television actresses